Inquiries into Human Faculty and Its Development is an 1883 book by Francis Galton, in which he covers a variety of psychological phenomena and their subsequent measurement. In this text he also references the idea of eugenics and coined the term for the first time (though he had published his ideas without the name many years earlier).

External links 
 Text and facsimile
Inquiries into Human Facility and its Development, Nature volume 28, pages97–98(1883)
 

1883 non-fiction books
Eugenics
Works by Francis Galton